Marthe Marie Louise Boyer-Breton (1879-1926) was a French artist.

Biography
Boyer-Breton née Breton was born in 1879 in Paris. Her teachers included Léon Bonnat, Louis Humbert, and Philippe Parrot. She married the author Jean Auguste Boyer. Boyer-Breton exhibited her work in the Woman's Building at the 1893 World's Columbian Exposition in Chicago, Illinois. She died in 1926.

Gallery

References

External links
 

1879 births
1926 deaths
19th-century French women artists
20th-century French women artists
19th-century French painters
20th-century French painters